The National Museum of Health and Medicine (NMHM) is a museum in Silver Spring, Maryland, near Washington, D.C. The museum was founded by U.S. Army Surgeon General William A. Hammond as the Army Medical Museum (AMM) in 1862; it became the NMHM in 1989 and relocated to its present site at the Army's Forest Glen Annex in 2011. An element of the Defense Health Agency (DHA), the NMHM is a member of the National Health Sciences Consortium.

History

19th century
The AMM was established during the American Civil War as a center for the collection of specimens for research in military medicine and surgery. In 1862, Hammond directed medical officers in the field to collect "specimens of morbid anatomy...together with projectiles and foreign bodies removed" and to forward them to the newly founded museum for study. The AMM's first curator, John H. Brinton, visited mid-Atlantic battlefields and solicited contributions from doctors throughout the Union Army. During and after the war, AMM staff took pictures of wounded soldiers showing the effects of gunshot wounds as well as results of amputations and other surgical procedures. The information collected was compiled into six volumes of The Medical and Surgical History of the War of the Rebellion, published between 1870 and 1883.

20th century
During the late 19th and early 20th centuries, AMM staff engaged in various types of medical research. They pioneered in photomicrographic techniques, established a library and cataloging system which later formed the basis for the National Library of Medicine (NLM), and led the AMM into research on infectious diseases while discovering the cause of yellow fever. They contributed to research on vaccinations for typhoid fever, and during World War I, AMM staff were involved in vaccinations and health education campaigns, including major efforts to combat sexually transmissible diseases.

By World War II, research at the AMM focused increasingly on pathology. In 1946 the AMM became a division of the new Army Institute of Pathology (AIP), which became the Armed Forces Institute of Pathology (AFIP) in 1949. The AMM's library and part of its archives were transferred to the National Library of Medicine when that institution was created in 1956. The AMM became the Medical Museum of the AFIP in 1949, the Armed Forces Medical Museum in 1974, and the NMHM in 1989. During its peak years on the National Mall in the 1960s, every year the museum saw "as many as 400,000 to 500,000 people coming through". But after its moves to increasingly obscure and out-of-the-way sites, it fell into a period of relative neglect. By the 1990s, it was attracting only between 40,000 and 50,000 visitors a year.

In 1989, C. Everett Koop (in his last year as Surgeon General) commissioned the "National Museum of Health and Medicine Foundation", a private, nonprofit organization to explore avenues for its future development and revitalization, intending to ultimately returning its collection to a venue on the National Mall. Proposed was “a site on land that is located east of and adjacent to the Hubert H. Humphrey Building (100 Independence Avenue, Southwest, in the District of Columbia)”. In 1993, a draft bill authored by Sen. Edward Kennedy  proposed $21.8 million for moving the existing collection to a new facility to be constructed on that site. That bill, however, was never introduced owing to political difficulties including objections from Constance Breuer—widow of Marcel Breuer, architect of the Humphrey Building—who objected to the view obstruction that the proposed construction would entail. A letter from the Department of Defense to Koop in the mid-1990s, expressed hope that the NMHM exhibits would "one day be provided the appropriate and prominent home they deserve back at the National Mall in the new National Health Museum". But the DoD backed away from contributing to funding a new museum. The foundation was superseded by a new organization, dedicated to creating a National Health Museum, that focused on public health education. Although the effort for a physical museum appears to be defunct, the museum maintains a virtual presence.

2011 move
Due to the closure of Walter Reed Army Medical Center, National Museum of Health and Medicine has relocated—for the tenth time—to U.S. Army Garrison-Forest Glen in Silver Spring, Montgomery County, Maryland.

Authority over the Forest Glen garrison was transferred from WRAMC to Fort Detrick in October 2008. The NMHM closed its exhibits on April 3, 2011, and reopened in a new building on September 15, 2011. On October 1, 2015, the NMHM became part of the Defense Health Agency.

Holdings

Major collections
The NMHM embodies five collections consisting of about 25 million artifacts, including 5,000 skeletal specimens, 8,000 preserved organs, 12,000 items of medical equipment, an archive of historic medical documents, and collections related to neuroanatomy and developmental anatomy. The museum's most famous artifacts relate to President Abraham Lincoln and his assassination on April 14, 1865, by John Wilkes Booth. 

On display is a copy by sculptor Avarel Fairbanks of Lincoln's life mask and hands made by Leonard Volk in 1860, the bullet fired from the Deringer pistol which ended the president's life, the probe used by the U.S. Army Surgeon General to locate the bullet during autopsy, pieces of Lincoln's hair and skull, and the autopsy surgeon's shirt cuff, stained with Lincoln's blood. In 2010 the heirs of American pathologist  Thomas Harvey (1912–2007) transferred all of his holdings constituting the remains of Albert Einstein's brain to the NMHM, including 14 photographs of the whole brain (which is now in fragments) never before revealed to the public.  Also on display is a small portion of Booth's spine, surgically removed to dislodge the bullet that killed him after his escape from justice ended at Port Royal, Virginia, fired from Union soldier Boston Corbett.

Museum collections include:
 The Historical Collections document changes in medical technology since the early 19th century. Included in this growing assemblage of more than 12,000 objects are x-ray equipment, microscopes, surgical instruments, numismatics and anatomical models.
 The Anatomical Collections are made up of bones and body parts. More than 5,000 skeletal specimens and 10,000 preserved organs document medical cases of disease and injury. The collection supports research in pathology, physical anthropology, forensic anthropology, and paleopathology.
 The Otis Historical Archives houses photographs, illustrations, and documents related to health and medicine. More than 350 different collections document, in pictures and words, the practice of medicine from the Civil War to the present.
 The Human Developmental Anatomy Center maintains the largest collection of embryologic material in the United States. The center is a primary source for centralized research in developmental anatomy. The center is also known for its imaging and 3-D reconstructions of embryo development.
 The Neuroanatomical Collections comprise nine different collections focusing on human and non-human neuroanatomy and neuropathology. These collections are a unique international resource for the study of the brain.

Major exhibitions
Museum exhibition Galleries feature several permanent exhibits alongside several rotating displays.
 Advances in Military Medicine: During times of war and times of peace, American military medical personnel have cared for service men and women with skill and compassion. But new weapons and new environments bring new injuries, and epidemic disease remains a foe uniting all eras of combat. The unwavering commitment of military personnel to provide the best care in difficult and dire conditions, often on an enormous scale and at a fast pace, has led to major medical breakthroughs, improving the lives of people around the world.

In this category the museum houses a notable holding brought directly from the Middle East, its “Trauma Bay II, Balad, Iraq”. The exhibit features a section of the actual emergency room tent used at Balad, Iraq, from 2003 to 2007, including the bloodstained floor where the most seriously wounded were treated. It was in these operating theaters throughout Iraq that many lifesaving medical trauma techniques were developed, with some posting survival rates topping 95%. This meant that soldiers were now regularly surviving severe wartime injuries that previously would’ve been fatal. Arrangements were made to ship these items from Iraq when a visiting US Congressional delegation were moved by the stories they’d heard.

 Anatomy and Pathology: These specimens provide examples of healthy anatomical structures. Healthy specimens establish a reference point for anatomical study. Comparing healthy specimens with diseased or injured tissues can help illustrate the changes caused by illness and trauma. Understanding these processes is often the first step towards improved prevention and treatment.
 Collection that Teaches: The Army Medical Museum, nearly from the time of its founding in 1862, was engaged in an innovative effort to collect, collate and share the lessons of battlefield medicine during the course of the Civil War.

Past exhibits include;  
 To Bind Up the Nation's Wounds: Medicine During the Civil War shows Civil War medicine through the eyes of battlefield surgeons and the stories of Union and Confederate sick and wounded.
 Evolution of the Microscope displays items from the world's largest and most representative collection in tracing the development of the basic tool of the bioscientist over the last 400 years.
 Battlefield Surgery 101: From the Civil War to Vietnam, exclusively from the museum's historical archives and historical collections, presents the highlights of the evolution of military surgical activities over the last 140 years through a selection of photographs and 19th- and 20th- century artifacts.
 Abraham Lincoln: The Final Casualty of the War: To mark the 200th anniversary of President Abraham Lincoln's birth, NMHM honors the 16th president of the United States with this exhibition of items associated with his last hours and the physicians who cared for him.
 Trauma Bay II, Balad, Iraq, offers a rare view inside a former Air Force tent hospital in Balad, Iraq.
 Resolved: Advances in Forensic Identification of U.S. War Dead highlights the underlying forensic sciences that have evolved in fulfilling this nation's commitment to the identification and commemoration of the U.S. service member.

Programs offered

The museum offers a wide variety of programs on weekends, weekdays, and evenings throughout the year for adults and children, with topics ranging through a spectrum of medical, scientific, and historical subjects.
 Public Programs
 Tours
 Brain Awareness Week

Location and hours
The museum is located at 2500 Linden Lane in Silver Spring, Maryland, one mile outside the District of Columbia. It is open to the public, but security restrictions require a photo ID for all adult visitors. It is open from 10 a.m. to 5:30 p.m. every day except Christmas (when it is closed), and admission is free.

See also
Army Medical Museum and Library
United States Army Medical Department Museum
 Daniel Sickles's leg

References

External links

 The National Museum of Health and Medicine official website
 Defense Health Agency, J-9 Research and Development, National Museum of Health and Medicine website
 BrainMuseum.org – a partnership of the University of Wisconsin and Michigan State Comparative Mammalian Brain Collections and the National Museum of Health and Medicine
 James G. Mundie's photographs from The National Museum of Health and Medicine
 C-SPAN American History TV Tour of the National Museum of Health and Medicine's Civil War Collection
 C-SPAN American History TV Tour of the museum looking at 'Medical History'

Forest Glen Annex
Museums established in 1862
Medical museums in the United States
Science museums in Maryland
Military and war museums in Maryland
Military medicine in the United States
1862 establishments in Maryland
Museums in Montgomery County, Maryland
Buildings and structures in Silver Spring, Maryland